The Little Samaritan is a 1917 American silent drama film directed by Joseph Levering and starring Marian Swayne, Carl Gerard and Lucile Dorrington.

Cast
 Marian Swayne as Lindy Gray
 Carl Gerard as Reverend
 Sam Robinson as Noah
 Lucile Dorrington

References

Bibliography
 Hans J. Wollstein. Strangers in Hollywood: the History of Scandinavian Actors in American Films from 1910 to World War II. Scarecrow Press, 1994.

External links
 

1917 films
1917 drama films
1910s English-language films
American silent feature films
Silent American drama films
American black-and-white films
Films directed by Joseph Levering
1910s American films